Eifelland was a German Formula One team, named after its German owner Günther Hennerici's caravan manufacturing company. Hennerici owned a successful business and in the beginning he saw racing as a great possibility to advertise his product. The name Eifelland was chosen after the Eifel mountains where Hennerici was born, which are located close to the Nürburgring.

Hennerici had a twin brother Heinz who lost his left arm in the Second World War. However, he was a devoted racing driver who still holds a record in his group at the Nürburgring. The brothers were very involved in racing in general and helped to establish the AC Mayen with many other racing fanatics in and from Mayen. Günther's third wife  was a successful Formula 2 driver, and Heinz's grandson Marc Hennerici was a very successful racing driver in his own right. Heinz was a popular figure around the Nürburgring until his death.

However, Hennerici was known to have a temperament which is still rather famous in and outside the paddock. He sold his business a couple of years later and turned back to racing, but most of his achievements are lost. His dream from the 1970s came true in 2010 when Mercedes Benz re-established itself in Formula One. The Hennerici brothers were very passionate about the old style racing and Günther is remembered as one of the pioneers and visionaries of modern German racing principals.

Eifelland only participated in the FIA Formula One World Championship in the 1972 Formula One season. Their driver was German Rolf Stommelen, however the two soon suffered disagreements.

The car was based on a March 721 Formula One car, redesigned by German designer Luigi Colani in his typical rounded aerodynamic style. The car featured an air intake in front of the driver, with the air being guided around the cockpit to the engine. A single rear view mirror was mounted in front of the driver. Problems with overheating, downforce and reliability meant that the team had to replace some of Colani's designs with the originally-designed parts from March.

Complete Formula One World Championship results
(key)

References

External links
 F1 Rejects article about the team
 Forix article
 Team results at motorsport-total.com

Formula One constructors
Formula One entrants
Formula Two entrants
1972 establishments in West Germany
1972 disestablishments in West Germany
German auto racing teams
German racecar constructors
Auto racing teams established in 1972
Auto racing teams disestablished in 1972